Rome Baptist Church is an English-speaking Baptist church located located in Rome, Italy.

History 

The Rome Baptist Church building is located in a palazzo in Piazza San Lorenzo in Lucina that was once part of Palazzo Ruspoli, originally built in the 16th century. The location where the church now stands was originally the stable for the Ruspoli family horses. The Foreign Mission Board, the international missionary agency of the Southern Baptist Convention, purchased the building in 1920, and deeded it to the Baptist Evangelical Christian Union of Italy in 1994. The building consists of a first floor sanctuary seating more than 200, classrooms for Sunday school and meeting rooms on the second floor, and a third floor apartment for the pastor.

Twelve people met in the worship room at Piazza San Lorenzo on 12 August 1962, the first meeting of the congregation now known as Rome Baptist Church. The church was officially organized on 10 March 1963 with 15 charter members. Organization efforts were led by Rev. William C. Ruchti, the pastor, and his wife, Helen, missionaries sent to Rome by the Foreign Mission Board.

Ruchti served as church pastor until June 1985 when he was replaced by Rev. Kenneth Lawson, assisted by his wife Irene. Lawson served until May 1998, after which the church relied on volunteer pastors and missionaries for several years. In April 2001 Rev. David Hodgdon and his wife Cathy arrived from Buena Vista, Colorado, to serve as pastor and wife and they remain to this day. In September 2000 the church became independent of the International Mission Board (formerly the Foreign Mission Board) and became a self-supporting independent church.

Services 
Sunday services are as follows:
 Bible study: 9:30am
 English language service: 10:30am
 Filipino language service:1:00pm
 Chinese language service: 3:00pm
 Italian language service: 6:30pm

List of pastors 
 Rev. William C. Ruchti (12 August 1962 – June 1985
 Rev. Kenneth Lawson (June 1985 – May 1998)
 Rev. David Hodgdon (April 2001 – )

See also 
 Protestantism in Italy

External links 
 Church website

References 

Baptist churches in Italy
Protestant churches in Rome
20th-century Baptist churches